Delamere Francis McCloskey (April 29, 1897 – December 14, 1983) was a Canadian-born American attorney and politician, who represented the 1st District on the Los Angeles City Council from 1941 to 1945.

Biography
McCloskey was born April 29, 1897, in Canada and became a United States citizen in 1928. His mother's birth name was Price. McCloskey was admitted to the bar in California on June 3, 1930. His wife, Irene, died of burns suffered in a December 13, 1965, accident in the back yard of their home at 13511 Hart Street, Van Nuys. He died December 14, 1983.

Public office

Elections

Municipal court
McCloskey, who was endorsed by the End Poverty in California organization, ran second in an election to replace Municipal Judge Marchetti, Office No. 10, in the primary election of April 1935 but was challenged by the next runner-up, Lyndon Bowring, because McCloskey had not been a California lawyer for the required five years, as required by the state constitution. McCloskey argued that he would have been eligible, if elected, on the day of taking office, July 1, but the Supreme Court of California disagreed and ordered McCloskey off the final ballot in June and Bowring to take his place.

City Council

See also List of Los Angeles municipal election returns, 1939–45

In his first bid for City Council in 1939 in Los Angeles City Council District 1, representing the San Fernando Valley, McCloskey survived the first round of voting but was defeated by the  incumbent, Jim Wilson, in the final election. In the 1941 final, though, it was McCloskey who was the winner over Wilson. McCloskey had no serious opposition in 1943 and was reelected in the primary vote. In 1945, however, he was ousted by Leland S. Warburton in the final election.

Superior Court
While a City Council member in 1944, he ran for Office No. 1 in the Los Angeles County Superior Court against the incumbent, Charles S. Burnell, but lost by a 3–1 ratio.

City Council

These are some of the positions McCloskey took while on the City Council:

Speed traps, 1941. He condemned a "speed trap" policy, "in which motorcycle policemen hide behind gas stations and billboards to pounce upon the unwary motorist." He said better results could be obtained by having the officers patrol the streets in plain sight.

Stoves, 1942. McCloskey was responsible for rescuing twenty-five pot-bellied stoves, "discarded by the Fire Department, relics of those days when outlying  fire stations were without gas." The stoves were reconditioned and lent to the Red Cross  "so soldiers occupying isolated searchlight posts in  the San Fernando Valley could keep warm on winter nights."

Taxes, 1943. He submitted a resolution that would have levied a 0.05% municipal sales tax, noting that:

Since the advent of the war, many thousands of persons from other states who earn large salaries in war industries and do not own any real property have become residents . . . [who are] receiving the benefits of representation without taxation.

Objectors, 1944. McCloskey voted in favor of a bill that would have given returned veterans preference over reemployment of conscientious objectors who had been given leaves of absence from their city service in order to enter special work camps set aside for them. He wrote to Wendell L. Miller, a minister who objected to his stance:

... if all of our young men entered such refuges ... the nation would cease to exist and we would become vassals of the Japs and the Huns.

Hog ranch, 1944. The City Council unanimously adopted McCloskey's resolution asking federal and state authorities to investigate a report that Japanese and Japanese-American detainees at Manzanar, California, would be put to work operating a large hog ranch that might pollute Los Angeles municipal water supplies from the Owens Valley.

References

Access to the Los Angeles Times links may require the use of a library card.

1897 births
1983 deaths
California lawyers
Los Angeles City Council members
20th-century American lawyers
20th-century American politicians
Canadian emigrants to the United States